The 1930 New Mexico gubernatorial election took place on November 4, 1930, in order to elect the Governor of New Mexico. Incumbent Republican Richard C. Dillon was term-limited, and could not run for reelection to a third consecutive term.

General election

Results

References

gubernatorial
1930
New Mexico
November 1930 events